Love Is a Four Letter Word is an Australian drama written by Matt Ford produced by the Australian Broadcasting Corporation in 2001. It was set and filmed in Newtown, in Sydney, New South Wales, following the lives of a group of friends working in a pub, and the concerns facing urban 20somethings in Australia.  One of the regular features of the drama was a performance in the pub by a contemporary Australian band.  The program is currently in syndication in the United States on Vibrant TV Network.

Cast and characters
Peter Fenton as Angus O'Neil
Kate Beahan as Alicia 'Albee' Barrett
Paul Barry as Paul Bannister
Leeanna Walsman as Larissa Barrett
Linal Haft as Bernie O'Neil
Matt Doran as Phil 'Klaus' Kaperberg
Teresa Page as Juliette Briones
John Molloy as Roy Williams
Garry McDonald as Tom Mattingly
Annie Davis-McCubbin as Maya Fink
Rudi Baker as Quentin Richards
Paul Tassone as Eddie Bird
Damian Walshe-Howling as Dean Masselos
Joel McIlroy as Brent Duffy
Zoe Coyle as Melissa Duvet
Genevieve Mooy as Evelyn Richards

Featured bands
pre.shrunk
Machine Gun Fellatio
The Duvets (fictitious band created for the show) 
Stella One Eleven
Widow Jones
On Inc
Jackie Orszaczky and the Grandmasters
Nokturnl
Hamish Cowan
Jodi Phillis
I Can't Believe It's Not Rock
Bernie Hayes
Luke Hanigan
The Dumb Earth
Endorphin
Tim Freedman
Sunk Loto
Christa Hughes
Felicity Hunter

Soundtrack

See also
Twentysomething – a comedy series from 2007, set in Sydney.

References

External links
 ABC: Love Is a Four Letter Word homepage
 

2001 Australian television series debuts
2001 Australian television series endings